Where Others Wavered: The Autobiography of Sam Nujoma. My Life in SWAPO and My Participation in the Liberation Struggle of Namibia, commonly known as Where Others Wavered, is an autobiographical work written by Sam Nujoma and published by Panaf Books in 2001. The text describes his life, from his childhood through his beginnings with SWAPO, exile in Angola and Zambia, as well as part of his presidency.

Nujoma was the leader of the South West Africa People's Organization (SWAPO) from its founding in 1960 until retirement in 2007 as well as being the first President of Namibia from election in 1990 until 2005.

See also
Namibia: The Struggle for Liberation (2007)

References

Further reading
André du Pisani, Memory politics in "Where Others Wavered. The Autobiography of Sam Nujoma. My Life in SWAPO and my participation in the liberation struggle of Namibia", Journal of Namibian Studies, 1 (2007).

2001 books
Books about apartheid
South African Border War books
Political autobiographies
History of Namibia
Apartheid in South West Africa
Namibian books
SWAPO